Aggripa Matshameko (born 25 May 1970) is a Botswana sprinter. He competed in the 4 × 400 metres relay at the 1996 Summer Olympics and the 2000 Summer Olympics.

References

External links
 

1970 births
Living people
Athletes (track and field) at the 1996 Summer Olympics
Athletes (track and field) at the 2000 Summer Olympics
Botswana male sprinters
Olympic athletes of Botswana
Place of birth missing (living people)